Virginia's 55th House of Delegates district elects one of 100 seats in the Virginia House of Delegates, the lower house of the state's bicameral legislature. District 55 represents parts of Caroline, Hanover, and Spotsylvania counties. The seat is currently held by Republican Hyland F. Fowler Jr.

Elections

2017
In the November 2017 election, Democrat Morgan Goodman ran against incumbent Fowler.

References

Virginia House of Delegates districts
Caroline County, Virginia
Hanover County, Virginia
Spotsylvania County, Virginia